is a public transportation company which operates local and long-distance buses in Niigata prefecture, Japan.

Bus lines 

, the following bus lines are in service.

Regular buses
Timetables - Niigata Kotsu (2018.3)

BRT

Central Niigata
RouteMap (Central Niigata) - Niigata Kotsu (2018.3)

South Niigata
RouteMap (South Niigata) - Niigata Kotsu (2018.3)

West Niigata
RouteMap (West Niigata) - Niigata Kotsu (2018.3)

East Niigata
RouteMap (East Niigata) - Niigata Kotsu (2018.3)

Highway buses

Niigata Prefecture domestic lines 

 Niigata - Nagaoka
 Niigata - Maki
 Niigata - Sanjo, Tsubame
 Niigata - Takada - Naoetsu

Inter-prefecture lines 

 Niigata - Omiya, Tokyo
 Niigata - Nagano
 Niigata - Toyama
 Niigata - Kanazawa
 Niigata - Kyoto, Osaka
 Niigata - Nagoya
 Niigata - Sendai
 Niigata - Kōriyama
 Niigata - Aizuwakamatsu
 Niigata - Yamagata

Gallery

References

External links
  

Bus companies of Japan